The South Pacific Classic is an Australian Jockey Club listed Thoroughbred horse race for three-year-olds, at set weights, over a distance of 1400 metres. It is held annually at Randwick Racecourse in Sydney in April. Total prize money for the race is A$100,000.

History
 The race was a Listed class race before 2003.
 The race was down graded to a Listed race in 2011.

Winners

	2010	Star Of Octagonal
	2009	Fravashi
	2008	Royal Discretion
	2007	Danleigh
	2006	Martiniforus
	2005	Shania Dane
	2004	Only Words
	2003	Bollinger
	2002	Gabfest
	2001	Century Kid

See also
 List of Australian Group races
 Group races

References

 Australian Studbook - AJC South Pacific Classic Race Winners
 

Horse races in Australia